Pristimantis xeniolum is a species of frog in the family Strabomantidae.

It is endemic to Colombia.
Its natural habitat is tropical high-altitude grassland.

References

xeniolum
Endemic fauna of Colombia
Amphibians of Colombia
Amphibians of the Andes
Frogs of South America
Amphibians described in 2001
Taxonomy articles created by Polbot